Mohamed Konaté (born 12 December 1997) is a professional footballer who plays as a forward for Russian Premier League side Akhmat Grozny. Born in Ivory Coast, he represents Burkina Faso at international level.

Club career
Konaté made his debut in the Russian Premier League for Ural Yekaterinburg on 17 September 2016, in a game against Anzhi Makhachkala. Konaté left Ural Yekaterinburg in February 2017 in pursuit of more first team football. On 22 April 2017, he debuted for his new club, Latvian Babīte, and scored on his debut.

In July 2017, Konaté and Cédric Gogoua joined Kairat's academy side Kairat-A until the end of the 2017 season. Following the completion of the 2017 Kazakhstan First Division, Konaté went on trial with Belarusian Premier League side Gomel.

On 24 June 2018, Pyunik announced the signing of Konaté. On 1 June 2019, Konaté was released by Pyunik.

On 2 September 2019, he signed with the Russian Football National League side Khimki.

On 18 May 2021, Akhmat Grozny announced the signing of Konaté on a one-year contract, with the option of additional two years.

International career
Born in the Ivory Coast, Konaté is of Burkinabé descent. On 9 October 2020, Konaté represented the Burkina Faso national team in a friendly 3–0 win over DR Congo.

Career statistics

Club

International

Scores and results list Burkina Faso's goal tally first, score column indicates score after each Konaté goal.

References

External links
 

1997 births
Living people
People from Odienné
Ivorian people of Burkinabé descent
Citizens of Burkina Faso through descent
Sportspeople of Burkinabé descent
Burkinabé footballers
Ivorian footballers
Burkina Faso international footballers
Association football forwards
2021 Africa Cup of Nations players
Russian Premier League players
Latvian Higher League players
FC Ural Yekaterinburg players
FC Kairat players
FC Gomel players
FC Pyunik players
FC Tambov players
FC Khimki players
FC Akhmat Grozny players
Burkinabé expatriate footballers
Ivorian expatriate footballers
Expatriate footballers in Russia
Expatriate footballers in Latvia
Expatriate footballers in Kazakhstan
Expatriate footballers in Belarus
Expatriate footballers in Armenia
21st-century Burkinabé people